This is a list of wars involving Republic of Kazakhstan, Kazakh and the predecessor states of Kazakhstan to the present day. It also includes wars fought outside Kazakhstan by the Kazakh military.

Legends of results:

Cumania (1025-1243) 
After the fall of the Kimek-Kipchak confederation at the beginning of the 11th century. military-political hegemony on the territory of the former settlement of the Kimek, Kipchak and Cuman tribes passed into the hands of the Kipchak khans. The dynastic nobility of the Kipchaks who came to power began to take active steps in the southern and western directions, which led to direct contacts with the states of Central Asia and Southeast Europe.

Kazakh Khanate (1465-1847) 
Kazakh khanate was established by Janibek Khan and Kerei Khan in 1465. Both khans came from Turco-Mongol clan of Tore which traces its lineage to Genghis Khan through dynasty of Jochids. The Tore clan continued to rule the khanate until its fall to the Russian Empire.

From 16th to 17th century, the Kazakh Khanate ruled and expanded its territories to eastern Cumania (modern-day West Kazakhstan), to most of Uzbekistan, Karakalpakstan and the Syr Darya river with military confrontation as far as Astrakhan and Khorasan Province, which are now in Russia and Iran, respectively. The Khanate was later weakened by a series of Oirat and Dzungar invasions. These resulted in a decline and further disintegration into three Juzes, which gradually lost their sovereignty and were incorporated to the expanding Russian Empire in the 19th century.

Colonial Age (1847-1917) 
In 1847, the khan's power in the Kazakh zhuzes was abolished, and the territory as an administrative unit was included in the Russian Empire.

Alash Autonomy (1917-1920) 
Kazakhs, tired of almost a century of Russian colonization, started to rise up. In the 1870s-80s, schools in Kazakhstan massively started to open, which developed elite, future Kazakh members of the Alash party. In 1916, after conscription of Muslims into the military for service in the Eastern Froby during World War I, Kazakhs and Kyrgyzs rose up against the Russian government, with uprisings until February 1917.

The state was proclaimed during the Second All-Kazakh Congress held at Orenburg from 5–13 December 1917 OS (18-26 NS), with a provisional government being established under the oversight of Alikhan Bukeikhanov. However, the nation's purported territory was still under the de facto control of the region's Russian-appointed governor, Vassily Balabanov, until 1919. In 1920, he fled the Russian Red Army for self-imposed exile in China, where he was recognised by the Chinese as Kazakhstan's legitimate ruler.

Following its proclamation in December 1917, Alash leaders established the Alash Orda, a Kazakh government which was aligned with the White Army and fought against the Bolsheviks in the Russian Civil War. In 1919, when the White forces were losing, the Alash Autonomous government began negotiations with the Bolsheviks. By 1920, the Bolsheviks had defeated the White Russian forces in the region and occupied Kazakhstan. On 17 August 1920, the Soviet government established the Kirghiz Autonomous Socialist Soviet Republic, which in 1925 changed its name to Kazakh Autonomous Socialist Soviet Republic, and finally to Kazakh Soviet Socialist Republic in 1936.

Soviet Age (1920-1991) 
The Kazakh ASSR was originally created as the Kirghiz Autonomous Socialist Soviet Republic (not to be confused with Kirghiz ASSR of 1926–1936, on 26 August 1920 and was an autonomous republic within the Russian Socialist Federative Soviet Republic.

At  in area, it was the second-largest republic in the USSR, after the Russian SFSR. Its capital was Alma-Ata (today known as Almaty). During its existence as a Soviet Socialist Republic, it was ruled by the Communist Party of the Kazakh SSR (QKP).

Republic of Kazakhstan (1991-present) 
Kazakhstan was the last of the Soviet republics to declare independence during the dissolution of the Soviet Union from 1988 to 1991.

References
22.Http://orenbkazak.narod.ru/lib.htm

 
Kazakhstan
Military history of Kazakhstan
Wars